Milken may refer to:

Michael Milken (born 1946), American financier and philanthropist, pleaded guilty in 1990 to U.S. securities law violation and pardoned by President Trump in 2020
Lowell Milken (born 1948), American businessman, philanthropist, brother of Michael
Milken Institute
Milken Institute School of Public Health
Milken Community Schools

See also 
 Millikan (disambiguation)
 Milliken (disambiguation)
 Millikin (disambiguation)